The InterContinental Nha Trang is a beachfront hotel in Nha Trang, located between the Sheraton Nha Trang and the Havana hotel Nha Trang. Originally designed as a Crowne Plaza, the hotel underwent re-branding in 2013 and is now upgraded to an InterContinental hotel. The hotel is opened on March 17, 2014.

Location 
InterContinental Nha Trang is located in the center of beach front Tran Phu street. The hotel is part of The Costa residence complex, which belong to the same Vietnamese owner - TD Corporation.

Facilities
InterContinental Nha Trang was designed by the Singaporean architect Tan Hock Beng, who also worked on the W Retreat Koh Samui. Accommodation includes 279 guest rooms, 56 of which are suites.

Dining
The hotel has one restaurant, "Cookbook Cafe" which is an all day dining restaurant serving a buffet breakfast and a la carte lunch and dinner.

References

InterContinental hotels
Nha Trang
Hotels in Vietnam
Hotel buildings completed in 2014
Hotels established in 2014
2014 establishments in Vietnam